Abdallah Bah (born 30 November 1975) is a retired Guinean footballer. He played as a goalkeeper.

During his professional career, Bah played in France, Spain, England and the United States. Internationally, he was part of the Guinean 2004 African Cup of Nations team, who finished second in their group in the first round of competition, before losing in the quarterfinals to Mali.

External links

1975 births
Living people
Footballers from Dakar
People with acquired Guinean citizenship
Guinean footballers
Association football goalkeepers
Ligue 1 players
OGC Nice players
CP Mérida footballers
Leyton Orient F.C. players
D.C. United players
Guinea international footballers
1998 African Cup of Nations players
2004 African Cup of Nations players
Guinean expatriate footballers